Edward Weed may refer to:

 Edward P. Weed (1834–1880), Connecticut politician
 Edward Thurlow Weed (1797–1882), New York newspaper publisher and politician
 Edward Weed (fl. 1821–1822), co-founder of Weedsport, New York
 Edward Weed (fl. 1895), inventor of wax foundation rollers